Mario Gjurovski (born 11 December 1985) is a Macedonian football manager and former player who played as a midfielder, who is the current manager of Thai League 1 club Muangthong United.

Playing career

Club

Gjurovski played in the youth team of Čukarički, before moving to Red Star Belgrade. He spent the entire 2003–04 season on loan, first with Mladenovac and then with Red Star's satellite club Sopot, both of them playing in the Serbian League Belgrade.

In summer 2004, he signed with Bežanija playing in the Second League of Serbia and Montenegro. After two seasons the club achieved promotion in 2006 into the newly formed Serbian SuperLiga. In summer 2007 Gjurovski leaves Bežanija after having played over 80 league matches with them and having scored 18 goals, and signs with another SuperLiga club Vojvodina. After having initially limited chances, after a couple of seasons he became a standard player in the club. They archived finishing second in the 2008–09 season, and becoming 2009–10 Serbian Cup runners-up after losing the final against his former club Red Star, by 0–3. Gjurovski left Vojvodina during the winter break of the 2010–11 season after having played over 50 league matches in three and a half years.

Ukrainia
On 1 March 2011, Gjurovski signed a 3-year deal with Ukrainian Premier League side Metalurh Donetsk.

Thailand
In 2012, he moved to Muangthong United from Thailand Premier League. Gjurovski played under Slaviša Jokanović coaching and helped Muangthong United to win the invincible domestic title in his first season in Thailand. Gjurovski scored a goal for Muangthong United and 1–3 lost against Buriram in 2015 Thai FA Cup final. It was the last match of him under Maungthong United shirt.

In May 2013, Gjurovski gained notoriety when after scoring a goal, he took his shorts off and put them on his head, revealing his tight grey briefs. He received a second yellow card and got sent off.

Despite the four successful seasons at Muangthong United, he rejected to renew the contract with Muangthong and moved to Bangkok United in 2016 on a free transfer.

On 21 November 2018, Gjurovski signed a contract with Muangthong United.

On 10 January 2020, Gjurovski has announced his retirement from football at the age of 34 after a seven-year in the Thai League.

International
He made his senior debut for Macedonia in a May 2010 friendly match against Azerbaijan in which he immediately scored his first international goal and has earned a total of 12 caps, scoring 2 goals. His final international was a November 2011 friendly against Albania.

Managerial career

Muangthong United
On 19 October 2020, Gjurovski was appointed as the new head coach of Thai giant Muangthong United.

Personal life
He is the son of former Macedonian international striker Milko Djurovski who previously played for Red Star Belgrade, Partizan and Groningen, and nephew of Boško Gjurovski, who also represented North Macedonia and Yugoslavia internationally.

The correct spelling of his last name is Gjurovski, as it appears in his Macedonian passport.

Career statistics

Club

International goals

Managerial

Honours

Player
Muangthong United
Thai Premier League: 2012

References

External links
 
 Profile at MacedonianFootball.com
 

1985 births
Living people
Footballers from Belgrade
Macedonians of Serbia
Macedonian people of Serbian descent
Association football midfielders
Macedonian footballers
North Macedonia international footballers
OFK Mladenovac players
FK Sopot players
FK Bežanija players
FK Vojvodina players
FC Metalurh Donetsk players
Mario Gjurovski
Mario Gjurovski
Mario Gjurovski
First League of Serbia and Montenegro players
Serbian SuperLiga players
Ukrainian Premier League players
Mario Gjurovski
Mario Gjurovski
Macedonian expatriate footballers
Expatriate footballers in Ukraine
Macedonian expatriate sportspeople in Ukraine
Expatriate footballers in Thailand
Macedonian expatriate sportspeople in Thailand
Mario Gjurovski